Hyphaene is a genus of palms native to Africa, Madagascar, the Middle East, and the Indian subcontinent.

The genus includes the Doum palm (H. thebaica). They are unusual among palms in having regular naturally branched trunks; most other palms are single-stemmed from the ground. In Swahili, it is called ‘’koma’’.

 Hyphaene compressa H.Wendl. - eastern Africa from Ethiopia to Mozambique
 Hyphaene coriacea Gaertn. - eastern Africa from South Africa; Madagascar; Juan de Nova Island
 Hyphaene dichotoma (J.White Dubl. ex Nimmo) Furtado - India, Sri Lanka
 Hyphaene guineensis Schumach. & Thonn. - western and central Africa from Liberia to Angola
 Hyphaene macrosperma H.Wendl. - Benin
 Hyphaene petersiana Klotzsch ex Mart. - southern and eastern Africa from South Africa to Tanzania
 Hyphaene reptans Becc. - Somalia, Kenya, Yemen
 Hyphaene thebaica (L.) Mart. - northeastern, central and western Africa from Egypt to Somalia and west to Senegal and Mauritania; Middle East (Palestine, Israel, Saudi Arabia, Yemen)

References

 
Arecaceae genera